Omonia is an underground station under the Omonoia square of Athens, used by Athens Metro lines 1 and 2.
The first station opened 1895 but had been completely redesigned until 1930 as an underground Metro station. In January 2000 the additional platforms for Line 2 were opened.

Interchanges

Station layout

References

External links

Athens Metro stations
Railway stations located underground
Railway stations opened in 1895
Railway stations opened in 2000
1895 establishments in Greece